Kim Seong-eun (born 9 July 1967) is a South Korean water polo player. He competed in the men's tournament at the 1988 Summer Olympics.

References

1967 births
Living people
South Korean male water polo players
Olympic water polo players of South Korea
Water polo players at the 1988 Summer Olympics
Place of birth missing (living people)